David Thomas Miskelly (born 3 September 1979) is a retired Northern Irish professional footballer. Miskelly spent the majority of his playing career in Northern Ireland with Portadown making 441 appearances across his career.

External links

1979 births
Living people
People from Newtownards
Association football goalkeepers
Oldham Athletic A.F.C. players
Macclesfield Town F.C. players
Portadown F.C. players
NIFL Premiership players
English Football League players
Northern Ireland under-21 international footballers
Association footballers from Northern Ireland